St. Bartholomew's Anglican Church may refer to:


Australia
 St. Bartholomew's Anglican Church and Cemetery (Prospect, New South Wales)

Canada
 St. Bartholomew's Anglican Church (Ottawa)
 St. Bartholomew's Anglican Church (Toronto)

United States
 St. Bartholomew's Anglican Church (Tonawanda, New York)

See also
 St. Bartholomew's Church (disambiguation)